Private Information is a 1952 British drama film directed by Fergus McDonell and starring Jill Esmond, Jack Watling and Carol Marsh. It was made at Walton Studios as a second feature.

Synopsis
A woman battles against corruption in her local council.

Cast
 Jill Esmond as Charlotte Carson
 Jack Watling as Hugh Carson
 Carol Marsh as Georgie Carson
 Gerard Heinz as Alex  
 Mercy Haystead as Iris Freemantle
 Norman Shelley as Herbert Freemantle  
 Lloyd Pearson as Mayor George Carson
 Henry Caine as Forrester  
 Brenda de Banzie as Dolly Carson

Critical reception
It was one of 15 films selected by Steve Chibnall and Brian McFarlane in The British 'B' Film, their survey of British B films, as among the most meritorious of the B films made in Britain between World War II and 1970. They noted that it "develops its issue with the venalities of local government and sub-standard housing in calm and sufficient detail to establish its seriousness of purpose", which was "skillfully interwoven with the elements of personal drama". They added that "the screenplay seems to have been worked on with rather more care than was routinely the case with B films". They also praised the "carefully observed performance" by Jill Esmond, "a fine, undervalued stage actress".

References

External

1952 films
British drama films
1952 drama films
Films set in England
Films directed by Fergus McDonell
Films shot at Nettlefold Studios
British black-and-white films
1950s English-language films
1950s British films